Francisco Lufinha (born 9 August 1983, in Lisbon, Portugal), achieved several world records, namely the Fastest Atlantic Kiteboat Crossing (solo) in 2021 and the Longest Journey Kitesurfing (without stops) in 2015. He is a completely passioned by nautical sportsman. Taken aboard a boat by his parents only 15 days after he was born, he was never able nor wanted to let go of the sea again.  

At age eleven, he started to compete in the Optimist dinghy class, where he won several regional and national races and ended representing his country at the ’98 Europeans in Split, Croatia. At age 15 he upgraded to the 420 (dinghy) (boats of two persons) where he raced until he was eighteen and won the national overall ranking.

While developing his sailing skills, he was always looking for the most recent extreme sport to try to learn how to do it. Water skiing and wakeboarding were his first choices, then windsurfing and the latest, in 2002, was kitesurfing. 

Francisco found in kitesurfing the most complete sport he has ever tried, because it is a mix of his favorite sports. In 2005 he was national champion and in 2006 vice-champion.

Studies and career 
In parallel with his sportive life, Francisco graduated from a master's degree in engineering and industrial management at Instituto Superior Técnico in 2007, which lead to jobs as auditing at Deloitte, strategy marketing analyst at BES bank, co-manager of the Portuguese offshore sailor ’s project, CTO at ConsultaClick.com (co-founder), general manager at Dakhla Attitude resort in Morocco, private yacht skipper and manager and in 2014 was co-founder of +Mar (Portuguese association for promoting the nautical tourism and sports) in which he is President, nautical events organizer and speaker at conferences and company private events.

Extreme challenges

Transat 650 
From 2009 to 2011, Francisco was co-manager of the solo sailor Francisco Lobato's campaign, in which they have won the extreme Transat 6.50 race from France to Brazil in 2009 and several other races in the Figaro solo sailing class.

Kitesurf Odyssey, 4 extreme challenges between 2013 and 2017 
This challenge consisted of kitesurfing from the city of Porto to Lagos, Portugal, covering more than 500 km of the Portuguese coast non-stop. This had never been done before and was an idea that Francisco had in his mind for some years, after sailing the Portuguese coast several times in his family boat or with his sailing expert friend Francisco Lobato. In 2013 he dedicated his time and effort to make this adventure happen and he understood that it could be possible to do it kitesurfing without stops, with a good wind forecast for the entire course.
Francisco trained for this highly demanding challenge that has taken his limits to an extreme test, both physical and mentally.
He made it till the end and kitesurfed 564 km in 28 hours and 53 minutes, always on the board, setting a new world record for longest distance kiteboarding without stops.

EDP Atlantic Mission - Kiteboat world record 
In November 2021, Lufinha started his boldest challenge aboard a kiteboat developed by himself, to cross the Atlantic Ocean from Lisbon to Martinica, solo, without any support boat. He reused a fast sailing trimaran with 7,25m by 5,6m wide, removed the sailing rig, built a cabin to live in and adapted kite control technology to be able to go as fast as possible to the other side. He had to stop in La Palma / Canary islands to repair Kites and wait for good wind conditions. He set sail from La Palma on the 30th November 2021 and arrived to Martinica / Caribbean on the 20th December 2021, setting a new world record of 20 days for the fastest atlantic kiteboat crossing solo.

Results

Sailing

Optimist Class 

1994
Sailing Schools Regional Champion (solo + team)
Sailing Schools National Champion (solo)

1995
Nr 1 National Ranking class B

1996
13th national championship, Cascais
4th “Trofeu Martin Barrero” – Vigo, Spain

1998
7th overall national Championship
36th European Camp. – Split, Croatia
(Achieved High Level Competition athlete status)

420 Class 

1999
3rd Júnior national Championship – Azores Islands

2000
7th Júnior overall national Championship
24th Júnior European Championship - Germany

2001
1st overall national Championship/Ranking
2nd Old Spice Regatta
11th European Championship – Geneva, Switzerland)

Mistral Class 
2000
3rd Portuguese júnior Championship – Azores Islands
5th Vilamoura Sailing Week - Portugal

Kitesurfing 
2002
Started kitesurfing

2003
11th Overall Ranking National Kiteboard Tour

2004
13th KPWT event at Matosinhos/Portugal
1st Corona European Champion at Caparica/Portugal
3rd Corona European Champion at Alacati/Turkey

2005
Portuguese National Kiteboard Tour Champion

2006
Portuguese National Kiteboard Tour Vice-Champion
7th KPWT event at Paros/Greece

2007
6th at PKRA Racing, in Portugal

Events

III Feira Náutica do Tejo 
Head of the organization of the 3rd edition of the "Feira Náutica do Tejo", the biggest nautical show in Portugal in 2014.
Head of the organization of "WaterKings", the ultimate watersports challenge in Lagos/Portugal, mixing kitesurf+windsurf+SUP+sailing in the same course.

Movies 
Francisco directed the first Portuguese kitesurf movie "KitePróTuga", in 2006.
Francisco directed the documentary "Ocean Adventures", about the Transat 650 sailing race and Francisco Lobato's journey in 2009.
Francisco directed the 3 documentaries of the several "Kitesurf Odyssey" challenges around the Portuguese Sea.

References

External links 

 Lufinha - Official Webpage
 +Mar - Nautical Sports and Tourism Association
 MINI Kitesurf Odyssey Video Teaser
 MINI Kitesurf Odyssey Clipping Video

1983 births
Living people
Portuguese kitesurfers
Portuguese sportsmen
People from Lisbon
University of Lisbon alumni
Male kitesurfers